was a Japanese journalist, author, and one of Japan's leading military commentators. He personally knew many of the Japanese naval commanders of the Second World War. He was the author of the book The End of the Imperial Japanese Navy (連合艦隊の最後: 太平洋海戦史), first printed in 1956, which was a dramatic account offering a rare glimpse into Japanese naval warfare in the Pacific, from the attack on Pearl Harbor to the final bloody sorties as American forces closed in on Japan.

Bibliography

References 

Japanese journalists
1889 births
1962 deaths
20th-century Japanese writers
20th-century journalists